There are nine video games based upon the American animated television series South Park.

Video games

Cancelled games
A South Park game was in development for the Game Boy Color (1998), as well as one for Xbox, GameCube and PlayStation 2. Neither game was ever officially announced, although the Game Boy Color ROM was leaked in 2018. Another game entitled A Week In South Park was also in development for the PlayStation and PC during the same time as South Park. This game was reported to be "around 15 percent done" before it was cancelled.

References

External links
South Park licensees at MobyGames

South Park (video game series)
 
South Park